The relations between Taiwan (officially known as the Republic of China), and the European Union (EU) are complicated by the fact that, pursuant to the One-China policy, all EU member states recognize the People's Republic of China (PRC) as the sole sovereign state under the name 'China'. 

Both the EU and Taiwan (ROC) are informed by their shared democratic tradition and close high-tech economic ties. While historically economic relations have been significant, they were often overshadowed by the EU's relations with larger trading partners like Japan and the US. More recently, relations with Taiwan have been overshadowed by booming economic opportunities in China.

The EU manages the European Economic and Trade Office in Taipei, while the ROC operates the Taipei Representative Office in the EU and Belgium in Brussels.

History 

Prior to the existence of the European Community, many European states had relations with the Ming dynasty as early as the 16th century. The most important relationship, apart from Britain-China connected China with France and Germany. Many states had diplomatic relations with the Empire of Japan which held Taiwan from 1895 to 1945.

2000s
In 2001, the EU Commission referred Taiwan as a "separate customs territory, but not as a sovereign state", highlighting the role of Taiwan as autonomous economic entity for the purposes of the establishment of relations with the European Union.

In 2009 there were more than 30,000 Taiwanese students studying in Europe. Also in 2009 the EU opened a European Union Centre in Taiwan.

2010s
Filip Grzegorzewski took over as the chief of the European Economic and Trade Office (EETO) in Taiwan in September 2019.

2020s
In April 2020 European Commission President Ursula von der Leyen tweeted her appreciation for Taiwan's donation of 5.6 million masks to EU countries to help fight the COVID-19 outbreak.

In December 2020 European Parliament vice president Nicola Beer announced her intention to visit Taiwan as soon as the global COVID-19 pandemic allowed.

In November 2021 a European Parliament delegation composed of members of the Special Committee on Foreign Interference and Disinformation (INGE) visited Taiwan.

In January 2021, the European Parliament passed two Taiwan related resolutions. Within, the EU Parliament affirmed that "the Union will remain vigilant regarding the situation in Taiwan and the upgrading of political and trade relations between the EU and the Republic of China (Taiwan)".  The Parliament called "for the EU and its Member States to revisit their engagement policy with Taiwan." In addition, the EU Parliament here advocated Taiwan's continued and increased participation in international organizations. It also acknowledged and criticized the increased military provocation by the People's Republic of China in and around Taiwanese territory. The EU Parliament called for the status quo of Taiwan's de facto independence not to be changed unilaterally. In this context, the resolution also included a warning "against Chinese efforts towards stronger power projection in the region."

In September 2021, MEPs from the European Parliament Committee on Foreign Affairs prepared a report vowing for closer relations and a stronger partnership vis-à-vis Taiwan, while hailing Taiwan as a key EU partner and showing grave concern for Chinese military pressure waged against the island.

In July 2022, the new EU ambassador to China Jorge Toledo Albiñana said that the EU does not support Taiwan independence, but “peaceful reunification”, adding: “We believe that there should be only one China, but in the event of a military invasion we have made it very clear that the EU, with the United States and its allies, will impose similar or even greater measures than we have now taken against Russia.”

Trade 
In 2018 bilateral trade between Taiwan and the EU stood at  51.9 billion euros (US$58.1 billion).

Security cooperation
In 2011 and 2012 Taiwan worked with the EU's Naval Force in Operation Atalanta to counter piracy off the coast of Somalia. Since then exchanges and information sharing has continued, between 2011 and 2015 EU anti-piracy officials made five visits to Taiwan.

Cybersecurity is a field of strategic cooperation between the EU and Taiwan with both facing a significant cyber threat from the People's Republic of China.

Representation 
In December 2021 the EU representative office in Taiwan launched a series of short cooking movies on YouTube called "Taste of Europe" to introduce regional European cuisine to Taiwanese citizens.

See also 
 France–Taiwan relations
 Germany–Taiwan relations
 Lithuania–Taiwan relations

References 

 
Taiwan
Foreign relations of Taiwan